The A platform is a term most commonly associated with automobile body type and has several meanings:

 Chrysler A platform, a Chrysler automobile platform used in the 1960s
 General Motors A platform (1925), a midsize automobile platform of General Motors in use from 1961 to 1981 for rear wheel drive vehicles
 GM A platform (1982), a midsize automobile platform of General Motors in use from 1982 to 1996 for front wheel drive vehicles
 Volkswagen Group A platform, an automobile platform shared by the compact cars of the Volkswagen Group